The Grumman G-65 Tadpole was an American prototype light amphibian designed and built by Grumman. Only one was built and it did not enter production. It was later developed into a family of amphibious aircraft by David Thurston.

Design and development
Part of a project by Grumman to find types to produce once World War II had ended, the G-65 Tadpole was designed by a team under the direction of Hank Kurt. The Tadpole was a two or three-seat shoulder-wing cantilever monoplane with retractable tricycle landing gear. It was powered by a  Continental C125 engine above the rear fuselage driving a pusher propeller. Kurt first flew the Tadpole on 7 December 1944. The G-65 Tadpole postwar was not put into production for numerous reasons, those to include; the over anticipation of a private aviation market, less costly military surplus aircraft, and the inability to compete in the amphibious aircraft market.  Although not developed by Grumman, one of the design team, David Thurston, later developed the design into a family of amphibians including the Colonial Skimmer and Lake Buccaneer.

Specifications

See also

References

Notes

Bibliography

Tadpole
1940s United States civil utility aircraft
Flying boats
Amphibious aircraft
Single-engined pusher aircraft
High-wing aircraft
Aircraft first flown in 1944
Military aircraft